is a Mahjong game developed and published by Recom for the Xbox 360 system. The game was released on September 25, 2008.

On August 6, 2009, Janline R  was released for PlayStation 3.

Overview 
Janline is an online game where the rules of Japanese Mahjong are used. The game is known in the Japanese gaming community as a kusoge due to the low quality of both the game itself and of its customer support.

Quality of the game
Immediately after the release of the Xbox 360 version, players wrote about the following problems about the game on various internet forums. Moreover, the author of the official blog admitted to being an amateur at mahjong.
 The game often froze.
 Tiles which should be shown were hidden.
 The player was offered strange choices of tiles when performing chii.
 There were bugs with calculating points.
 The player who created a room would always be the dealer.
 In online matches, there was no penalty for disconnecting. Therefore one could intentionally disconnect without penalties if one thinks that one is about to lose the game.
 Whether intentionally or due to connection failure, if even one player disconnected, a round would end forcefully.
Due to these bugs, the official forums were flooded with demands to fix these bugs, to the point that an apology was issued on the same day as the game's release. The developer and publisher Recom promised to release a patch that fixes these bugs.

On December 4, 2008, an update was released as a patch to these bugs, but once this patch was applied, even more bugs appeared, a part of which are listed here:
 The game ran slowly.
 Freezing was more frequent than before the patch. Despite this, a penalty was implemented for disconnection.
 It was possible to intentionally freeze the game through specific actions.
 On exiting the game and returning to the main menu, on the prompt "Would you like to return to the main menu?" there were three options all reading "yes".
 Tiles were distributed as if intentionally.
 Tiles were displayed with a slant.
 With chii, pon and kan, irrelevant tiles would be revealed. If there are the right number of tiles, it was possible to make a winning hand.
 With kan, occasionally only two or three tiles would be removed from the hand. Tiles that were supposed to be removed instead remained in the hand, and it would be impossible to create a winning hand due to excess tiles .
 With kan, tiles would be stolen from other players' hands. The player performing the kan would have more tiles than necessary, and the other player would have less than necessary . Neither of these players could then make a winning hand.
 In normal Japanese mahjong rules, if kan is called four times in the same round that are not all by the same player, this round would end in a draw . However, in Janline, there is no draw and a fifth kan can be called.
 If consecutive games were played in the same room, in the second consecutive game, every second tile could be selected; in the game after that, every third tile could be selected, and so on.
 Voices bought in the DLC could not be played.
 The player drew a tile before the previous player discarded. This is called  and is against the rules of mahjong.
Recom closed the official forums and blog at the same time as the release of the patch. They did not respond to telephone calls from players, and any emails sent to Recom received automatic replies. Up to  there has not been an official report or apology regarding these bugs.

Janline R
On August 6, 2009, Janline was ported to PlayStation 3 under the name . Janline R added the features of 3D avatars, as well as the ability to use USB cameras. The critical bugs from the original Janline have been fixed in Janline R.

References

External links
 Xbox official site

2008 video games
Japan-exclusive video games
Mahjong video games
Video games developed in Japan
Xbox 360-only games
Xbox 360 games